Kebumen Regency is a regency in the southern part of the Indonesian province of Central Java. It covers an area of 1,281.115 km2 and had a population of 1,159,926 at the 2010 Census and 1,350,438 at the 2020 Census. Its capital is the large town of Kebumen.

There is an area in this regency which is used for geology research, namely Karangsambung.

Van Der Wijck Fortress
The fortress is located in Gombong City about 21 kilometers west of Kebumen or 100 kilometers from Borobudur. was built in 1818, by Dutch East India Company (VOC) to conquer Diponegoro war, there were many troops come to the location and make the fortress as office of military concentration. In 1844–1848 the fortress is built in the office location for preparation to clash with Yogyakarta Sultanate and named the fortress as Fort (Generaal) Cochius. In 1856 the fortress is used as Pupillenshool for European youngster who born in Indonesia (formerly Hindia Belanda). And finally, the Dutch colonial changed the name to Van Der Wijck Fortress.

The fortress has octagon shape with 7,168 square metres, 10-metre height and 1.4-metre wall depth with 2 storeys.

Geography 
Geographically, Kebumen is located at 7 ° 27 '- 7 ° 50' south latitude and 109 ° 22 '- 109 ° 50' east longitude. The southern part of Kebumen Regency is lowland, while in the northern part are the mountains and hills that are part of a series of South Serayu Mountains. Meanwhile, in the western region around Gombong, the Karst of South Gombong is a limestone mountain range that stretches to the south coast of north-south trending. This area has more than a hundred caves. The largest rivers in Kebumen are the Luk Ulo River, Jatinegara River, Karanganyar River, Kretek River, Kedungbener River, Kemit River, Gombong River, Ijo River, Kejawang River, and Gebang River.

The Total Area and Use

Kebumen has a total area of 128,111.50 ha or 1,281.115 km2 with the conditions of some areas of the coastal areas and mountains, but the majority of the lowlands.

In the area of Kebumen, recorded 49,768.00 hectares, or about 31.04% as a wetland and 108,343.50 hectares or 68.96% as dry land.

According to its use, the vast majority of irrigated land technical and almost entirely (46.18%) can be planted twice a year, partly in the form of rainfed (37.82%), which in some places can be planted twice a year, and 11.25% of irrigated land half-technical and simple.

Dry land is used for building area of 40,985.00 hectares (37.73%), dry land / garden area of 33,777.00 hectares (33.57%) as well as state forest covering an area of 22,861.00 hectares (21.08%) and the rest is used for field pasture, pond, pool, woody plants, as well as land and land cultivated while not others.

Administrative districts
Kebumen Regency comprises twenty-six districts (kecamatan), tabulated below with their areas and their populations at the 2010 Census and the 2020 Census. The table also includes the locations of the district administrative centres, number of administrative villages (rural desa and urban kelurahan) in each district and its post code.

Boundary

Kebumen Regency Leader

Education

TK (Taman Kanak-Kanak)/ Kindergarten 
 TK Aisyiyah 9 Kalibeji
 TK Pertiwi Kalirancang
 RA Masyithoh Gombong

SD (Sekolah Dasar)/ Elementary School 
 SD N 1 Klirong
 SD N 1 Pringtutul
 SD N Sitirejo
 SD N 4 Karanganyar
 SD N 2 Pringtutul
 SD N 2 Wonokromo
 SD N Purwodadi
 SD N 2 Sukomulyo
 SD N 1 Candi
 SD N Pondok Gebangsari
 SD N 1 Sawangan
 SD N 3 Sawangan
 SD N 1 Sidomukti
 SD N 2 Sidomukti
 SD N 1 Kalirancang
 SD N 2 Kalirancang
 SD N 3 Kalirancang
 MI N Grogolpenatus
 SD N Jatiluhur
 MI S Islamiyah Logede
 SD N Ginandong
 SD N 1 Kritig
 SD N Panjatan
 SD N 3 Klapasawit
 SD N 1 Brecong
 SD N 1 Jatijajar
 SD N 1 Pangempon
 SD N Menganti
 SD N Karangsari
 SD N 1 Kuwayuhan
 SD N 3 Jatisari
 SD N Arjosari
 SD N 1 Kajoran
 SD N 2 Kajoran
 SD N 1 Karanggayam
 SD N 2 Karanggayam
 SD N 3 Karanggayam
 SD N 1 Kalirejo
 SD N 1 Karangtengah
 SD N 1 Karangsambung
 SD N 2 Karangsambung
 SD N 3 Karangsambung
 SD N 1 Tunggalroso
 SD N 2 Tunggalroso

SMP (Sekolah Menengah Pertama)/ Junior High School 
 SMP Islam Al Kahfi Somalangu Kebumen
 SMP N 1 Gombong
 SMP N 1 Alian
 SMP Ma'arif 1 Alian
 SMP N 1 Karanganyar
 SMP N 2 Karanganyar
 SMP N 3 Karanganyar
 SMP N 1 Rowokele
 MTs S Plus Nururrohmah Tambaksari
 MTs S Mafatikhul Huda
 SMP N 1 Kutowinangun
 SMP N 4 Gombong
 SMP Muhammadiyah 1 Gombong
 SMP Muhammadiyah 1 Karanganyar
 SMP Taman Dewasa Kebumen
 MTs N Kaleng Puring
 MTs N 2 Kebumen
 MTs N Klirong
 SMP N 1 Klirong
 SMP N 1 Kebumen
 SMP N 2 Kebumen
 SMP N 3 Kebumen
 SMP N 4 Kebumen
 SMP N 5 Kebumen
 SMP N 6 Kebumen
 SMP N 7 Kebumen
 SMP Muhammadiyah 1 Kebumen
 SMP Muhammadiyah 2 Kebumen
 SMP N 1 Karanggayam
 SMP N 2 Karanggayam
 SMP N 1 Karangsambung
 SMP N 2 Karangsambung
 SMP N 1 Prembun
 SMP N 2 Prembun
 MTs N 7 Kebumen

SMA / SMK / MA / Senior High School 
 SMA Negeri 1 Kebumen
 SMA Negeri 2 Kebumen
 SMA Negeri 1 Gombong
 SMA Negeri 1 Karanganyar
 SMA Negeri 1 Ayah
 SMA Negeri 1 Buluspesantren
 SMA Negeri 1 Karangsambung
 SMA Negeri 1 Kutowinangun
 SMA Negeri 1 Pejagoan
 SMA Negeri 1 Mirit
 SMA Negeri 1 Klirong
 SMA Negeri 1 Petanahan
 SMA Negeri 1 Prembun
 SMA Negeri 1 Rowoekele
 SMA Negeri 1 Karanggayam
 SMK Negeri 1 Kebumen
 SMK Negeri 2 Kebumen
 SMK Negeri 1 Gombong
 SMK Negeri 1 Karanganyar
 SMK Negeri 1 Puring
 SMK Negeri 1 Ambal
 SMK Ma'rif 1 Kebumen
 SMK Ma'arif 4 Kebumen
 SMK Batik Sakti 1 Kebumen
 SMK Batik Sakti 2 Kebumen
 SMK Taman Karya Madya Kebumen
 SMK Purnama 2 Gombong
 SMK Tamtama Karanganyar
 SMK Bina Karya 1 Karanganyar
 SMK Plus Nurrohmah Kuwarasan
 SMK Bina Nusantara Kebumen
 SMK Ristek Rowokele
 SMK Bina Teknika Sruweng
 SMK Wongsorejo Gombong
 SMK Muhammadiyah Kutowinangun
 SMK Komputer Karanganyar
 SMK Mutiara Alian
 SMA PGRI Prembun
 MAN 1 Kebumen
 MAN 2 Kebumen
 MAN Gombong
 SMK VIP Al-Huda
 MAN 3 Kebumen

University / College 
 Nahdlatul Ulama Ma'arif University (:id:Universitas Ma'arif Nahdlatul Ulama Kebumen)
 Dharma Patria Polytechnic (:id:Politeknik Dharma Patria Kebumen)
 Nahdlatul Ulama Islamic Institute (previous name STAINU Kebumen) (:id:Institut Agama Islam Nahdlatul Ulama Kebumen)
 Sebelas Maret University Campus VI PGSD Kebumen (:id:Universitas Sebelas Maret Kampus VI PGSD Kebumen)
 Putra Bangsa Institute of Economic Science (:id:Sekolah Tinggi Ilmu Ekonomi Putra Bangsa)
 Academy of Information and Computer Management PGRI (:id:Akademi Manajemen Informatika dan Komputer PGRI Kebumen)
 Muhammadiyah Institute of Technology (:id:Sekolah Tinggi Teknologi Muhammadiyah Kebumen)
 Muhammadiyah Institute of Health Science of Gombong (:id:Sekolah Tinggi Ilmu Kesehatan Muhammadiyah Gombong)

Mass Media 
Kebumen has a relatively complete mass media, both print and electronic media. Currently in Kebumen region there is published a daily newspaper "Kebumen Express", "Kebumen Online" which is part of Jawa Pos Group. In addition, there is also a "Radar Kebumen".

For electronic media, there are several commercial radio stations and one Kebumen district government-owned public radio, and a local television station.

Radio

Radio broadcasts from the town of Kebumen 
 Radio in FM
 Bimasakti FM
 Mas FM
 Radio DVK
 Ardana FM

Radio broadcasts from Karanganyar 
 Radio Ardana FM
 Ratih FM
 Mandala FM
 Swara Kedu FM
 Hasta Brata FM
 Kedu Community FM
 Radio Rodja AM
 At Tarbiyah FM

Radio broadcasts from Gombong 
 SKB Pop FM
 RP FM
 Gong Radio Gombong

Television Channel

Local Television Channel 
 Ratih TV (Gelombang 47 UHF), Kebumen district government-owned television.

Transportation 
Kebumen are on track across the southern island of Java. Intercity public transportation is served by buses and trains. Station Kebumen, Gombong and Karanganyar is a big station in Kebumen, in addition there are small stations such as Prembun, Soka, Kutowinangun and among railroad crossing Kebumen is Senja Utama and Fajar Utama (Jakarta Senen Market-Yogyakarta), Argo Wilis (Bandung-Surabaya Gubeng), Bima (Jakarta-Surabaya City Gubeng), Logawa (Purwokerto-Jember), and Kutojaya (Kutoarjo-Jakarta) Sawunggalih (Jakarta-Kutoarjo).

Adisucipto Airport can be reached by DAMRI buses, which is based at Pemuda street. In addition, the airport can be reached by Maguwo KRD Railway Express (Purwokerto-Kebumen-Maguwo) to Maguwo station that is located inside the airport.

Sports

Football 
Kebumen Regency also has a football team, under the name Persak Kebumen which stands for Indonesian Football Association of Kebumen. This team in the 2008–2011 period held a competition in the Indonesian Third Division. Persak Kebumen played in the 2014–2015 period playing in the Nusantara League competition. After the return of the Indonesian League, Persak Kebumen played in Liga 3 in 2019. Chandradimuka Stadium is a home venue of Persak Kebumen.

Futsal 
In addition to football clubs, Kebumen Regency has a professional futsal club namely SKN FC Kebumen. SKN FC Kebumen played in the Indonesia Pro Futsal League since 2018 as runner up. The competition that followed was 2018 AFF Futsal Championship as a semifinalist.

Typical Food 
Jenang Soap (Jenang Sabun)

Typical food, there are areas petanahan districts. It was sweet and typical, but already rare.

Lanthing

Lanthing (sometimes called klanthing), is a kind of snack crackers made from cassava in the form of a figure eight or a small circle like a ring. Originally only have a savoury flavour and salty but are now starting to appear a variety of spicy and salty flavours such as cheese flavour. This food very heavy if eating.

Obang Abing

The food is made from sticky rice sprinkled with sugar, but this food is getting hard to find.

Sale bananas (Sale Pisang)

Sale bananas are foods produced from thin combed bananas and then dried. Drying the goal is to reduce the water content of bananas so as banana sale more durable. This sale bananas can be eaten or fried with flour first. in addition, the current sale of bananas have a variety of flavours such as cheese flavour. Currently, the sale of banana production has penetrated the international market.

Sale of banana is a banana products are made by drying and curing process. Sale is known to have a distinctive flavour and aroma.

Sate ambal

Sate ambal is a type of chicken skewers unique to Ambal, Kebumen, Central Java.

Sate ambal differs to the typical sate due to the different ingredients used in the sauce. Instead of peanut sauce like sate Madura, sate ambal's sauce is very smooth more creamy in consistency rather than rough with crushed peanut texture. The sauce is more similar to those of sate padang in texture. Furthermore, what makes the sauce unique is the use of tempeh which is crushed and mixed with the seasoning and spices, making it indistinguishable anymore. 

Soto petanahan

Soto petanahan is quite different from the soup in other areas, its uniqueness make soup petanahan very popular with the public at large, soto petanahan containing the diamond, sprouts green, shredded chicken and sauce were tasty, but the soup is not as famous soto bandung and soto of other areas, if kebumen you stop by to try taking the time to try this culinary one. Traders soto petanahan petanahannya often found in the village itself and the area around the village petanahan, while the seller is already very famous, namely soup petanahan kored pack. Diselatan located petanahan market.

Soto Tahu

The food is typical of this one now very rare, even the food was only famous dikecamatan petanahan. When viewed dar, his name might appear normal, but once you try it you will feel addicted, this soup made with tofu, crank, sprouts and tofu kebumen typical peanut sauce smothered in gravy. fresh taste, suitable dinikamati harim during the day if you visit you must try the food kebumen this one. The food is not fancy but served direstoran on vendors who people call petanahan bango (a kind of selling houses made of bamboo and simple).

Empog empog

Kethek

Jipang nut (Jipang Kacang)

Lenthis

Rice penggel (Nasi Penggel)

Soto Tamanwinangun / Soto Kasaran

Thepleng pejet

See also

 Persak Kebumen
 SKN FC Kebumen

References

External links

 Official site (in Indonesian)
 Universitas Ma'arif Nahdlatul Ulama Kebumen (in Indonesian)
 Politeknik Dharma Patria Kebumen (in Indonesian)
 STIE Putra Bangsa (in Indonesian)
 AMIK PGRI Kebumen (in Indonesian)
 IAINU Kebumen (in Indonesian)
 STIKES Muhammadiyah Gombong (in Indonesian)
 STT Muhammadiyah Kebumen (in Indonesian)
 Universitas Sebelas Maret Kampus VI PGSD Kebumen (in Indonesian)